Fresnicourt-le-Dolmen is a commune in the Pas-de-Calais department in the Hauts-de-France region of France.

Geography

Population

Places of interest
 The church of Notre-Dame, rebuilt on old foundations during the 19th century.
 A group of dolmen, known as the Table des Fées (The Fairies' Table).
 The fifteenth century Château d'Olhain.
 The Arboretum d'Olhain

See also
Communes of the Pas-de-Calais department

References

External links

 Website of the château d'Olhain

Fresnicourtledolmen